The Seattle Stock Exchange was a regional stock exchange in the northwest United States, located in Seattle, Washington. It began operations on March 14, 1927, merged with the Seattle Curb and Mining Exchange on October 1, 1935, and closed on October 1, 1942.

In 1929 and 1930, stocks traded on the exchange included Carnation, the Dexter Horton National Bank and Seattle National Bank, Fisher Flouring Mill Co., Van de Kamp's Holland Dutch Bakeries, and Puget Sound Power & Light. Bonds traded included those of the W.E. Boeing Company, Seattle Times Company, the Northern Life Tower, Puget Sound Navigation Company, and the Olympic Hotel.

See also
 
List of former stock exchanges in the Americas  
List of stock exchange mergers in the Americas
 List of stock exchanges
 Spokane Stock Exchange
Exchange Building (Seattle)

References

Companies based in Seattle
Former stock exchanges in the United States